Indonesia participated in the 1982 Asian Games in Delhi, India on November 19 to December 4, 1982. Indonesia finished sixth in total medals.

Medal summary

Medal table

Medalists

References

Nations at the 1982 Asian Games
1982
Asian Games